Mineola is an unincorporated village and census-designated place in Mills County, Iowa, United States.

As of the 2010 Census, the population of Mineola was 166.

Mineola is in the Glenwood Community School District.

Demographics

References

External links
Community website

Unincorporated communities in Mills County, Iowa
Unincorporated communities in Iowa